Queen's Quay is a section of the River Lagan, in the western Titanic Quarter of the city of Belfast, Northern Ireland.

As its name suggests, it originally located the southern section of the Belfast docks complex. But, as ships grew, it became a major transportation hub for both the capital and Northern Ireland.

Belfast & County Down Railway (B&CDR), Queen's Quay station

Originally it was located in the southern section of the Belfast docks complex, but as ships grew it became the Belfast terminus of the Belfast and County Down Railway, linking Belfast south-eastwards via 80 miles of track into County Down. The first train from the station ran on 2 August 1848 to Holywood, with services eventually extending as far as Castlewellan, Downpatrick, Newcastle and the fishing village of Ardglass.

Queen's Quay also housed the B&CDR's locomotive maintenance workshops, and from 1886 the carriage works. The last carriage was built in 1923. All lines except to Bangor closed in 1950 shortly after nationalisation into the Ulster Transport Authority. The station was closed and demolished in 1976, and Bangor services were diverted to the new Belfast Central Station via the reopened Belfast Central line.

Today
In part, Queen's Quay now encompasses the A2 as it crosses the River Lagan at both Queen's Bridge and the Queen Elizabeth Bridge, and the M3 via the Cross Harbour link. The former site of the B&CDR station was used for a maintenance shop for the Northern Ireland Railways system until the mid-nineties.

Development
Queen's Quay, being a virtually derelict and under developed piece of land in central Belfast, is key to the development of the Titanic Quarter. After a number of development proposals, discussions are still taking place for a mixed-use development of housing, offices and retail, together with a small facility for leisure boats.

References

External links
Belfast Queen's Quay station signalbox

Geography of Belfast
Wharves in the United Kingdom